The inferior surface of the temporal lobe is concave, and is continuous posteriorly with the tentorial surface of the occipital lobe. It is traversed by the inferior temporal sulcus, which extends from near the occipital pole behind, to within a short distance of the temporal pole in front, but is frequently subdivided by bridging gyri.

References

External links 
 http://braininfo.rprc.washington.edu/centraldirectory.aspx?ID=130

Temporal lobe
Sulci (neuroanatomy)